Qarayazı or Karayazy may refer to:
Qarayazı, Agstafa, Azerbaijan
Qarayazı, Goychay, Azerbaijan